Greg Williamson (born 1964) is an American poet. He is most known for the invention of the "Double Exposure" form in which one poem can be read three different ways: solely the standard type, solely the bold type in alternating lines, or the combination of the two.

Life
Williamson grew up in Nashville, Tennessee. He was educated at Vanderbilt University, University of Wisconsin–Madison and Johns Hopkins University.

He teaches at Johns Hopkins University in the Writing Seminars and lives in Baltimore, Maryland.
He is Associate Editor at Waywiser Press.

Awards
 1998 Whiting Award
Nathan Haskell Dole Prize
 1995 Nicholas Roerich Poetry Prize
 John Atherton Fellowship
2004 Academy Award in Literature from the American Academy of Arts and Letters
The Best American Poetry 1998
 Runner-up for NYC Poets' Prize

Works
"The Birdhouse", Verse Daily
"from Double Exposures", Poetry, August 2000

Anthologies

References

External links
Profile at The Whiting Foundation

1964 births
Living people
American male poets
Vanderbilt University alumni
University of Wisconsin–Madison alumni
Johns Hopkins University alumni
Johns Hopkins University faculty
21st-century American poets
Writers from Nashville, Tennessee
21st-century American male writers